Doctors' Private Lives is a 1978 American made-for-television drama film starring John Gavin, Donna Mills, Ed Nelson, Barbara Anderson and directed by Steven Stern. It was broadcast on ABC on March 20, 1978.

It was a pilot for a short-lived television series of the same name that aired for four episodes from April 5 to April 26, 1979.

Cast
John Gavin as Dr. Jeffrey Latimer
Donna Mills as Dr. Beth Demery
Ed Nelson as Dr. Mike Wise
Barbara Anderson as Frances Latimer
William Kerwin as Dr. George Bana
Bettye Ackerman as Sylvia
John Randolph as Irv
Randolph Powell as Dr. Rick Calder
Fawne Harriman as Phyllis
Leigh McCloskey as Kenny
Kim Hamilton as Kitty
Elinor Donahue as Mona Wise

Reception
The Los Angeles Times called the film "lively but ludicrous and verges on self parody." It ranked 86th out of 114 shows airing that season, with an average 14.1/26 rating/share.

TV miniseries
One year after the TV movie's network premiere, a four-episode miniseries was produced and directed by Edward M. Abroms, Richard Benedict and Marc Daniels. John Gavin, Ed Nelson and Randolph Powell reprised their respective roles from the 1978 TV movie. The miniseries focused on the personal and professional crises of two heart surgeons: Chief Surgeon Dr. Michael Wise and cardiovascular Unit Chief Dr. Jeffrey Latimer.

Cast
Ed Nelson as Dr. Michael Wise
John Gavin as Dr. Jeffrey Latimer
Randolph Powell as Dr. Rick Calder
Phil Levien as Kenny Wise
Gwen Humble as Sheila Castle
Eddie Benton as Nurse Diane Cooper

Episodes

References

External links

1978 television films
1978 films
1978 drama films
ABC network original films
Films directed by Steven Hilliard Stern
Columbia Pictures films
1979 American television series debuts
1979 American television series endings
1970s American television miniseries
American Broadcasting Company original programming
Films scored by Richard Markowitz
Television films as pilots
Television shows set in Los Angeles
American drama television films
1970s American films